Rodolfo Llinás Riascos (born 16 December 1934) is a Colombian and American neuroscientist. He is currently the Thomas and Suzanne Murphy Professor of Neuroscience and Chairman Emeritus of the Department of Physiology & Neuroscience at the NYU School of Medicine. Llinás has published over 800 scientific articles.

Early life
Llinás was born in Bogotá, Colombia. He is the son of Jorge Enrique Llinás (a surgeon of Spanish descent, whose family arrived in Colombia at the end of the 19th century) and Bertha Riascos. He was motivated to study the brain by watching his grandfather Pablo Llinás Olarte working as a neuropsychiatrist. Llinás describes himself as a logical positivist.

Education and early research
Llinás went to the Gimnasio Moderno school in Bogotá and graduated as a medical doctor from the Pontifical Xavierian University in 1959. During his medical studies he had the opportunity to travel to Europe and there he met several researchers in Spain, France and finally Switzerland, where he participated in neurophysiology experiments with Dr. Walter Rudolf Hess, Nobel Prize in Physiology, Medicine, professor and director of the Department of the Institute of Physiology of the University of Zurich. Additionally, while studying medicine he made a theoretical thesis on the visual system under the tuition of neurosurgeon and neurophysiologist Fernando Rosas and the mathematician Carlo Federici at the National University of Colombia. He received his PhD in 1965 from the Australian National University working under Sir John Eccles.

Personal life
By graduation in Australia, he was very interested in the biological basis of the mind. During this time he met his future wife who was studying philosophy. His two sons, Drs. Rafael and Alexander Llinas, are also physicians. His wife, Gillian Llinas (née Kimber) is an Australian philosopher of mind.
Llinás was a scientific advisor during the establishment of an interactive science museum located in Bogotá, Colombia called Maloka Museum. In 2018, Llinás donated a T-Rex skeleton to the museum and helped to design a model of the nervous system for the dinosaur fossils.

Work
He has studied the electrophysiology of single neurons in the cerebellum, the thalamus, the cerebral cortex, the entorhinal cortex, the hippocampus, the vestibular system, the inferior olive and the spinal cord. He has studied synaptic transmitter release in the squid giant synapse. He has studied human brain function using magnetoencephalography (MEG) on the basis of which he introduced the concept of Thalamocortical dysrhythmia.

Career

Llinás has occupied a number of positions.
Research fellow, Massachusetts General Hosp.-Harvard University, 1960–61
National Institutes of Health research fellow in physiology, University of Minnesota, Minneapolis, 1961–63
Associate professor, University Minnesota, Minneapolis, 1965–66
Associate member, American Medical Association Institute Biomed. Research, Chicago, 1966–68
Member, American Medical Association Institute Biomed. Research, Chicago, 1970
Head neurobiology unit, American Medical Association Institute Biomed. Research, Chicago, 1967–70
Associate professor neurology and psychiatry, Northwestern University, 1967–71
Guest professor physiology, Wayne State University, 1967–74
Professorial lecturer pharmacology, University Ill.-Chgo., 1967–68
Clinical professor, University Ill.-Chgo., 1968–72
Professor physiology, head neurobiology div., University of Iowa, 1970–76
Prof., chairman physiology and biophysics, New York University, New York City, 1976—2011
Thomas and Suzanne Murphy professor neuroscience., New York University, 1985—
University Professor, Department of Neuroscience and Physiology., New York University, 2011—

Contributions
Llinás is known for his many contributions to neuroscience, however, his most important contributions are the following:

 Discovery of dendritic inhibition in central neurons (at the mammalian motoneuron).
 The functional organization of the cerebellar cortex neuronal circuits.
 Defining cerebellar function from an evolutionary perspective.
 First description of electrical coupling in the mammalian CNS (mesencephalic trigeminal nucleus).
 First determination of presynaptic calcium current, under voltage clamp, at the squid giant synapse.
 Discovery that vertebrate neurons (cerebellar Purkinje cell)  can generate calcium-dependent spikes.
 Proposal and Organization of NASA Neurolab Project that flew on April 17, 1998, Space Shuttle Columbia.
 Discovery of the P-type calcium channel in the Purkinje cells.
 Discovery of low threshold spikes generated by low voltage activated calcium conductaces (presently known as due to T-type calcium channel) in inferior olive and thalamus neurons.
 A tensor network model of the transformation of sensory space-time coordinates into motor coordinates by the cerebellum.
 Asserting the law of no interchangeability of neurons, which it is known as Llinás' law.
 Direct demonstration of calcium concentration microdomains at the presynaptic active zone.
 Utilization of magnetoencephalography in clinical research.
 Discovery of subthreshold membrane potential oscillations in the inferior olive, thalamus and entorhinal cortex.
 The discovery of Thalamocortical dysrhythmia.
 Artificial olivo-cerebellar motor control system as part of the project BAUV (Undersea Vehicle) of the US Navy developed by P. Bandyopadhyay.

Memberships and honors
Llinás is a member of the United States National Academy of Sciences (1986), the American Academy of Arts and Sciences (1996), American Philosophical Society (1996), the Real Academia Nacional de Medicina (Spain) (1996) and the French Academy of Science (2002). Dr. Llinás has received honorary degrees from the following universities:
Universidad de Salamanca (Spain) (1985)
Universitat Autonoma de Barcelona (Spain) (1993)
National University of Colombia (1994)
Universidad Complutense, Madrid, Spain (1997)
Los Andes University (Colombia), Bogotá, Colombia, (1998)
Toyama University, Toyama, Japan (2005)
University of Pavia, Pavia, Italy (2006)

Dr. Llinás has received the following awards:
UNESCO Albert Einstein medal (1991)
Order of Boyaca Awarded President of Colombia for exceptional service to Colombia (1992)
Bernard Katz Award Biohysical Society, Washington USA (2012)
, Spanish National Research Council, Madrid, Spain (2012)
Cajal Diploma given by Queen Sofia of Spain Madrid, Spain (2013)
Ragnar Granit Lecture and Award, Nobel Institute, Stockholm, Sweden (2013)
Castilla del Pino Lecture and Award Cordoba, Spain (2015)
Nansen Neuroscience Lecture and award Norwegian Academy of Science, Oslo, Norway (2016)
Scholar of the Year Australian National University, Canberra, Australia (2016)
Ralph W. Gerard Prize in Neuroscience Society for Neuroscience, (2018) 

He was the chairman of NASA/Neurolab Science Working Group, in 2011 received University Professor Distinction from New York University  and in 2013, the NYU Neuroscience Institute created the Annual Rodolfo Llinás Lecture Series in recognition of his contributions to the field of neuroscience.

Filmography 
 Llinas, el cerebro y el universo. Documentary film, by Gonzalo Argandoña, Cabala Producción Audiovisual,  (2018) RTVCplay

Selected bibliography
Llinás is the author of more than 20 book chapters and has edited several books on neuroscience.

Books 
Hubbard, J.I., Llinás, R. and Quastel, D.M.J.  Electrophysiological Analysis of Synaptic Transmission.  London: Edward Arnold Publishers 1969.
Llinás, R.   Editor.  Neurobiology of Cerebellar Evolution and Development. (Chicago: Am. Med. Association, 1969)
Precht, W., Llinás, R. (eds.): Frog Neurobiology: a handbook. (Berlin: Springer-Verlag, 1976).  
Steriade, M., Jones, E., y Llinás, R (Eds.): Thalamic Oscillations and Signaling. The Neurosciences Institute Publications Series. (John Wiley & Sons, 1990). 
Llinás, R. y Sotelo, C (eds.): The Cerebellum Revisited. (Nueva York: Springer-Verlag, 1992).  
Buzsaki, G., Llinas, R., Singer, W., Berthoz, A., Christen, Y. (eds.): Temporal Coding in the Brain. (Nueva York: Springer-Verlag, 1994).   
Latorre, R., López-Barneo, J., Bezanilla, F., Llinás, R. (Eds) Biofísica y fisiología celular. (Universidad de Sevilla, España, 1996). 
Llinás, Rodolfo R. and Churchland, Patricia S. Mind-Brain Continuum: Sensory Processes The MIT Press (September 9, 1996) 
Llinás, Rodolfo R. The Squid Giant Synapse : A Model for Chemical Transmission Oxford University Press, USA (December 15, 1999) 
Llinás, Rodolfo. El reto: Educación, Ciencia y Tecnología. Tercer Mundo Editores, (2000) 
Llinás, R. I of the vortex: from neurons to self (MIT Press, Cambridge, MA. 2001).

Book chapters 

Llinas R, Rivary U. Perception as an oneiric-like state modulated by the senses. Chapter 6. In: Koch C. Large-scale neuronal theories of the brain. Bradford Book. (1994). 
Llinas RR., Walton KD. Cerebellum. Chapter 7. In: Shepherd GM. The synaptic organization of the brain. 4th Ed. New York: Oxford University Press. (1998) 
Llinas RR., Walton KD., Lang EJ. Cerebellum. Chapter 7. In: Shepherd GM. The synaptic organization of the brain. 5th Ed. Oxford University Press. (2004) 
Llinas, R. R. Neuroscientific basis of consciousness and dreaming. Chapter 3.6. In: Kaplan and Sadock's Comprehensive textbook of psychiatry. Philadelphia: Lippincott Williams & Wilkins. 8th ed. (2005).
Llinás, R. Electrophysiology of the Cerebellar Networks. Comprehensive Physiology (2011). Supplement 2. Handbook of Physiology, The Nervous System, Motor Control.  
Llinas RR., Walton K. Central pain: a thalamic deafferentation generating thalamocortical dysrhythmia. Chapter 4. In: Saab CY. Chronic pain and brain abnormalities. Academic Press-Elsevier (2014). 
Llinas, RR. Oscillation in the inferior olive neurons: Functional implication. Chapter 39. pp. 293–298. In: Essentials of Cerebellum and Cerebellar Disorders: A Primer for Graduate Students. Springer (2016) 
Llinas, R. R. Consciousness and Dreaming from a Pathophysiological Perspective: The Thalamocortical Dysrhythmia Syndrome. Chapter 3.5. In: Kaplan and Sadock's Comprehensive textbook of psychiatry. Philadelphia: Lippincott Williams & Wilkins. 10th ed. (2017).

Selected review articles

References

External links

 NYU Neurophysiology website about Rodolfo Llinás
 NYU Medicine faculty website about Rodolfo Llinás

Newspaper articles
Estrella de la sabiduría en la Universidad Nacional Tribute at National University of Colombia
Enter the "I" of the Vortex The Science Network interview with Rodolfo Llinás
In a Host of Ailments, Seeing a Brain Out of Rhythm The New York Times December 8, 2008
 New Way Of Looking At Diseases Of the Brain The New York Times October 26, 1999
Listening to the Conversation of Neurons The New York Times May 27, 1997
New York Times announcement of election to the [National Academy of Sciences]

Colombian neuroscientists
Members of the United States National Academy of Sciences
1934 births
Living people
People from Bogotá
American neuroscientists
American atheists
New York University Grossman School of Medicine faculty
Pontifical Xavierian University alumni
Australian National University alumni
Members of the French Academy of Sciences
History of neuroscience
Fellows of the American Academy of Arts and Sciences
Members of the American Philosophical Society
American people of Colombian descent
Colombian atheists
Hispanic and Latino American scientists